Little Fishing Lake is a lake in the east-central region of the Canadian province of Saskatchewan. It is a recreational lake located within the Bronson Forest Provincial Recreation Site. The lake is in the Monnery River drainage basin, which is a tributary of the North Saskatchewan River. It is connected to the river via a short stream from its western shore.

On Little Fishing Lake's eastern shore is the community of Little Fishing Lake and a campground. Access to the lake and its amenities is from Highway 21.

Fish species 
Fish commonly found in the lake include walleye, northern pike, northern hogsucker.

See also 
 List of lakes of Saskatchewan
 Tourism in Saskatchewan

References 

Lakes of Saskatchewan
Loon Lake No. 561, Saskatchewan